Auvray is a French surname. Notable people with the surname include:

Félix Auvray (1800–1833), French painter
Jean-Claude Auvray, French opera director
Louis Auvray (1810–1890), French sculptor and art critic
Lydie Auvray (born 1956), French accordionist, composer and singer
Stéphane Auvray (born 1981), Guadeloupean footballer

French-language surnames